Cheng Fei (born May 29, 1988) is a retired Chinese artistic gymnast.  She is a three-time World Champion on the vault (2005–2007) and 2006 World Champion on floor exercise.  She was a member of the gold medal-winning Chinese teams for the 2006 World Artistic Gymnastics Championships in Aarhus, Denmark and 2008 Olympic Games in Beijing, China.  She was also a member of the silver medal-winning Chinese team for the 2007 World Artistic Gymnastics Championships in Stuttgart, Germany.

Biography
Cheng Fei was born in central China's Hubei Province to a father who was a shipping clerk and a mother who worked in a tire factory, not a very wealthy background. Indeed, said her mother, "Our family was poor so we hoped Cheng Fei could in some way change her life...we thought maybe being a professional athlete is good for her." And so her parents approached a gymnastics coach about training her by the time she was three and her father practiced calisthenics with her every morning before school. By the age of five, Cheng won her first competitive medal at a local competition. The 7-year-old Cheng was sent to Wuhan, where she joined the Wuhan Institute of Physical Education and officially entered the national sports program. Her first coach, Yao Juying remembered her as being uniquely 'hard-working' and extraordinarily focused. At ten, she was invited to join the Hubei provincial team. In late 2001, at the age of 13, she was accepted to the Chinese National Team. Her coaches are head coach Lu Shanzhen, and Liu Qun Lin.

Cheng Fei is well known in the sporting world for being highly consistent, powerful and elegant, as well as displaying a fine level of sportsmanship. Sandra Izbașa, 2008 Olympic Floor Champion has described her as a perfectionist, a great sport and a good friend. Shawn Johnson, 2008 Olympic Beam Champion, was also quoted to have called Cheng Fei 'inspirational' and 'a great competitor'. Cheng Fei's leadership abilities are of paramount importance to the Chinese Women's Gymnastics Team.

She retired in June 2012 due to a ruptured Achilles tendon while performing a tumbling pass on the floor.

Competitive history
Cheng Fei is a vaulting and floor exercise specialist. She has had national success in gymnastics as a two-time Chinese National Floor Exercise Champion (2004–2005), a two-time Chinese National Vault medalist (2003 and 2005) and the 2004 Chinese National Balance Beam Champion.

Internationally, she has been very successful as well. She competed with the Chinese team at the 2004 Olympic Games in Athens, Greece and although the team did not medal, she performed very well, scoring 9.475 on vault and 9.662 on floor. She also qualified for and competed in the floor exercise final, finishing 4th with a score of 9.412. She was the bronze medalist at the 2004 World Cup Final on floor exercise.

On 23 November 2005 Cheng made history at the 2005 World Artistic Gymnastics Championships in Melbourne, Australia, for being the first gymnast ever to successfully perform one of the most difficult vaults ever attempted by a woman.  The vault consisting of: a round-off onto the springboard, a half-turn onto the vaulting horse and a 1½ somersault with a 540-degree turn in a straight body position, is now officially recognized in the FIG Code of Points as "The Cheng" which carries a D-score of 6.5 under the 2009 Code of Points. During Event Finals on vault in Melbourne, Cheng scored 9.725 in her first vault (S.V: 10.0) and 9.587 in her second vault (S.V: 10.0), the "Cheng".

At the 2006 World Championships in Aarhus, Denmark, she competed on vault and floor exercise, qualifying in first position for both event finals. Her performances on those two pieces of apparatus were instrumental in securing victory for China in the team championship, but they also earned her the individual vault and floor exercise world titles. Cheng also won the gold medal on the vault at the 2006 World Cup Final in São Paulo, Brazil.

In 2007 Cheng began the year by winning the vault, balance beam and floor exercise titles at a World Cup event in Maribor, Slovenia.  She was undefeated on vaulting and floor exercise in 2007 until the 2007 World Championships in Stuttgart, Germany.  At those championships, Cheng was recognized as the leader for the Chinese women's team and though Cheng won her third World title on the vault, she made a serious error on the vault during the team championship where the Chinese team finished 2nd. She went on to finish 5th on floor exercise, with a score of 15.050, after stepping out of the bounds with both feet in her final tumbling series.

Cheng fulfilled her goal of competing at the 2008 Olympic Games in Beijing, China as the captain to the Chinese team. In the qualification, Cheng competed on three events, placing first on both vault and floor exercise, and fifth on balance beam. She was one of three female gymnasts to have entered 3 Olympic Event Finals in those Games, along with Nastia Liukin and Anna Pavlova. In the team final, She led the team to win China's first-ever women's gymnastics Olympic team gold medal in history. Individually, she won a bronze medal on vault (even after falling on her own "Cheng Fei vault"). She got 16.075 and 15.025 on her saltos. She won another bronze medal on balance beam (15.950) and placing 7th in the floor exercise event final (14.550), after an uncharacteristic fall. Cheng cried after the unfortunate vault and floor finals. After the Olympics, she said that she cried about her failure to capture the two gold medals she wanted most until she could cry no more. However, she received great support from both her fellow countrymen and the international gymnastics community, who acknowledged her talents and abilities as an exceptional gymnast. In a show of respect she gave the winner of the balance beam final Shawn Johnson of United States a small box with silk inside it.
After the Olympic Games, she competed in various competitions. She won three gold medals on vault, floor exercise and balance beam at the DTG World Cup in Stuttgart. Her last 2008 competition was the 14th Artistic Gymnastics World Cup in Madrid where she won two gold medals on vault and floor exercise.

In 2009, she competed at the 25th Universiade in Belgrade and won a team Gold medal and a Silver medal on Vault.

After a near two-year off from competitions due to a leg injury, she competed in the 2011 Chinese National Championships in May on vault and floor Exercise. She led the qualifications on vault and finished 2nd in the final. She announced her intention to compete in the University Games in August, but was reported to be suffering from leg injury again and retreated from the competition.

In April 2012, Cheng competed at the Zibo World Cup in her home country, qualifying second into the vault final behind the Dominican Republic's Yamilet Peña Abreu. She intended to compete floor as well, but withdrew prior to the qualifying round. Cheng won the gold medal in the vault final.

Cheng injured her Achilles tendon in June 2012, taking her out of the running for the 2012 Chinese Olympic Team. In June 2012, she announced her retirement from elite artistic gymnastics, trying to switch from being an elite gymnast to a gymnastics coach.

Skills

Eponymous skill
Cheng has one eponymous skill listed in the Code of Points.

Competitive Routines
As of 2008, Cheng Fei performed the following skills on these apparatuses:

Competitive highlights

Floor music
 2003: Lord of the Dance from Riverdance
 2004: Variations from Don Quixote
 2005–2007: Mas Zarzuela
 2008: Yellow River Concerto

References

 2008 Team China Profile

External links
 Cheng Fei profile at Gymnastics.About.com
 Cheng Fei biography at NBC Olympics site
 
 
 Cheng Fei (vault animation)

Chinese female artistic gymnasts
Gymnasts at the 2004 Summer Olympics
Gymnasts at the 2008 Summer Olympics
Medalists at the World Artistic Gymnastics Championships
Olympic bronze medalists for China
Olympic gold medalists for China
Olympic gymnasts of China
Originators of elements in artistic gymnastics
People from Huangshi
World champion gymnasts
1988 births
Living people
Olympic medalists in gymnastics
Gymnasts from Hubei
Medalists at the 2008 Summer Olympics
Asian Games medalists in gymnastics
Gymnasts at the 2006 Asian Games
Asian Games gold medalists for China
Medalists at the 2006 Asian Games
Universiade medalists in gymnastics
Universiade gold medalists for China
Universiade silver medalists for China
Medalists at the 2009 Summer Universiade
21st-century Chinese women